Andreas Sponsel (born 3 March 1986) is a German footballer who plays as a goalkeeper.

Career

Sponsel began his career with 1. FC Nürnberg, where he played in the youth and reserve team before joining Rot-Weiss Erfurt in 2009. In his first two seasons he served as understudy to Dirk Orlishausen, but after Orlishausen left for Karlsruher SC in 2011 he shared first-choice goalkeeping duties with Marcus Rickert until Rickert's departure in January 2013. He left Erfurt six months later to return to Bavaria to sign for SpVgg Bayreuth.

References

External links

1986 births
Living people
German footballers
1. FC Nürnberg II players
FC Rot-Weiß Erfurt players
3. Liga players
Association football goalkeepers
People from Forchheim
Sportspeople from Upper Franconia
Footballers from Bavaria